The Rt. Rev. Sundar Clarke (d 2010) was an Indian bishop in the  20th century: he was the Bishop of Madras from 1974 to 1990.

Notes

 

 

20th-century Anglican bishops in India
Indian bishops
Indian Christian religious leaders
Anglican bishops of Madras
2010 deaths